Bolt, in comics, may refer to:

 Bolt (DC Comics), a DC Comics supervillain
 Bolt, the alias of Chris Bradley (comics)
 Bolt, another name used by Starbolt
 Bolt, a character from AC Comics
 Bolt, a character from Image Comics who appeared in Capes and Invincible
 Bolt-01, the pen name of Dave Evans, editor of FutureQuake
 Black Bolt, a Marvel Comics superhero and leader of the Inhumans
 Blue Bolt, a Golden Age superhero
 Deadbolt (comics), a Marvel Comics character
 Deathbolt, a DC Comics character
 Dreadbolt, a Teen Titans villain and son of the DC Comics supervillain Bolt
 Silverbolt, a Transformers character
 Skybolt (comics), an alias used by the character better known as Redneck
 Thunderbolt (comics), especially The Thunderbolts

See also
 Bolt (disambiguation)

References